Tabea Kemme (born 14 December 1991) is a German former professional footballer who last played for Arsenal of the FA Women's Super League. She also played for 1. FFC Turbine Potsdam for twelve years.

During her youth career and the first two seasons of her senior career, Kemme played as an attacker. She switched to more defensive playing positions while playing for Germany U-20 during the 2010 FIFA U-20 Women's World Cup. Two of Kemme's goals for 1. FFC Turbine Potsdam, both long-range shots, were included in the 10 best goals of the German Football Association's Women's Goal of the Season 2014–2015 shortlist.

Kemme combined her football career with her police studies at Brandenburg's police training college.

Early life
Kemme attended the Friedrich Ludwig Jahn Potsdam Sport School, which has an elite program for girls' football. The school has very close links with the FFC Turbine Potsdam club.

Club career
In 2006, Kemme started training and playing with the junior teams of FFC Turbine, progressing to the senior first team in 2008.

She joined Arsenal in July 2018. After persistent injuries, Kemme announced her retirement from professional football on 14 January 2020.

International career
Kemme's first involvement with the Germany women's national football team was in the squad of players selected for a 2013 UEFA Women's Championship qualifying match against Romania on 22 October 2011, but she did not play in the match.
Kemme made her international debut for Germany during their 8–0 win against Croatia on 27 November 2013, a match in Germany's FIFA Women's World Cup 2015 qualification campaign. She came on as a substitute for Leonie Maier, in the 76th minute. Kemme was selected for the German squad for the FIFA Women's World Cup 2015 and played 6 matches in the tournament.

She was one of Germany's starting full-backs for the 2016 Summer Olympics, starting and playing every minute of all but one match. Germany would go on to win the gold medal.

International goals
Scores and results list Germany's goal tally first:

Source:

Honours

Club
1. FFC Turbine Potsdam
UEFA Women's Champions League: 2009–10
Frauen-Bundesliga: 2008–09, 2009–10, 2010–11, 2011–12
DFB-Hallenpokal: 2009, 2010, 2013, 2014
DFB Women's Under-17 Championship: 2007–08

Arsenal
 FA Women's Super League: 2018–19

International
Germany
FIFA U-20 Women's World Cup: 2010
UEFA Women's U-17 Championship: 2008
Algarve Cup: 2014
Summer Olympic Games: 2016

Police career 
In 2012, Kemme began her studies as a police commissioner at the University of Applied Sciences of the Brandenburg Police, which she successfully completed in September 2017. Kemme completed the practical part in Oranienburg. The theory part took place in Potsdam and Oberhavel.

References

External links

Profile  at DFB
Player German domestic football stats  at DFB

1991 births
Living people
People from Stade
German women's footballers
German expatriate women's footballers
Germany women's international footballers
German expatriate sportspeople in England
Expatriate women's footballers in England
1. FFC Turbine Potsdam players
Arsenal W.F.C. players
Women's association football defenders
Women's association football midfielders
Women's association football forwards
2015 FIFA Women's World Cup players
Footballers at the 2016 Summer Olympics
Olympic medalists in football
Olympic gold medalists for Germany
Medalists at the 2016 Summer Olympics
Olympic footballers of Germany
Footballers from Lower Saxony
Frauen-Bundesliga players
Women's Super League players
UEFA Women's Euro 2017 players